The Zagreb Mosque, located in the city of Zagreb, is the largest mosque in Croatia. The Islamic Secondary School "Dr. Ahmed Smajlović" and a cultural centre operate within the mosque. The construction began in 1981 and finished in 1987.

Sultan bin Muhammad Al-Qasimi, the Emir of Sharjah, donated US$2.5 million for the construction of the mosque. In 1983, he visited the Islamic community in Zagreb.

See also
Islam in Croatia
Gunja Mosque
Rijeka Mosque
Zagreb Cathedral

References

Bibliography

Mosques in Croatia
1987 establishments in Croatia
Mosques completed in 1987
Albanians of Croatia
Bosniaks of Croatia
Religious buildings and structures in Zagreb